Coccocephalichthys is an extinct genus of prehistoric bony fish.

Taxonomy
 Family Coccocephalichthyidae Fowler 1951
 Genus Coccocephalichthys Whitley 1940 [Coccocephalus Watson 1925 non Fieber 1860; Cocconiscus White & Moy-Thomas 1940] 
 C. baldwini (Poplin 1974) [Coccocephalus baldwini (Poplin 1974); Cocconiscus baldwini Poplin 1974]
 C. tessellatus Beltan 1981
 C. wildi (Watson 1925) Whitley 1940 [Coccocephalus wildi Watson 1925; Cocconiscus wildi (Watson 1925)]

See also

 Prehistoric fish
 List of prehistoric bony fish

References

Palaeonisciformes